Shenandoah Creek is a tributary of Mahanoy Creek in Schuylkill County, Pennsylvania, in the United States.

Course
Shenandoah Creek begins in West Mahanoy Township, at or near the confluence of the tributary Kehly Run. Upon entering Shenandoah, the creek flows south and then in a southwesterly direction, crossing Pennsylvania Route 924. It then turns west for several tenths of a mile, entering West Mahanoy Township and crossing Pennsylvania Route 54. Here, the creek flows west-southwest in a valley alongside Pennsylvania Route 54 for a few miles, receiving the tributary Lost Creek and crossing Pennsylvania Route 54 once, before entering a pond and flowing into Butler Township. Here, it exits the pond and flows west for a few tenths of a mile before turning southwest. After a few tenths of a mile, it passes through a wetland, enters Girardville, and reaches its confluence with Mahanoy Creek.

Tributaries
Shenandoah Creek has two named tributaries: Kehly Run and Lost Creek.

Hydrology
Shenandoah Creek is impaired by abandoned mine drainage throughout its length, and also by municipal point source pollution in one reach. Shenandoah Creek's contribution to the waters of Mahanoy Creek causes the latter creek's flow to nearly double.

Geography and geology

Watershed
The mouth of the creek is in the United States Geological Survey quadrangle of Ashland. However, its source is in the quadrangle of Shenandoah.

Shenandoah Creek is one of the major tributaries of Mahanoy Creek. There are several lakes/ponds in the creek's watershed, and a wetland occurs in its lower reaches.

History

Biology
The drainage basin of Shenandoah Creek is designated as a Coldwater Fishery and a Migratory Fishery.

See also
Little Mahanoy Creek, next tributary of Mahanoy Creek going downstream
North Mahanoy Creek, next tributary of Mahanoy Creek going upstream
List of rivers of Pennsylvania
List of tributaries of Mahanoy Creek

References

Rivers of Pennsylvania
Tributaries of Mahanoy Creek
Rivers of Schuylkill County, Pennsylvania